Kahnuj County is in Kerman province, Iran. The capital of the county is the city of Kahnuj. At the 2006 census, the county's population was 102,269 in 21,780 households. The following census in 2011 counted 86,290 people in 21,166 households, by which time Faryab District had been separated from the county to form Faryab County, and Deh Kahan Rural District of Manujan County had joined Kahnuj County. At the 2016 census, the county's population was 95,848 in 26,276 households. The majority of the people of Kahnuj are Baloch, and Balochi is the most widely spoken language.

Administrative divisions

The population history and structural changes of Kahnuj County's administrative divisions over three consecutive censuses are shown in the following table. The latest census shows two districts, five rural districts, and one city.

References

 

Counties of Kerman Province